Screen-Free Week (formerly TV Turnoff Week and Digital Detox Week) is an annual event where children, families, schools and communities are encouraged to turn off screens and "turn on life". Instead of relying on television programming for entertainment, participants read, daydream, explore, enjoy nature, and spend time with family and friends. Over 300 million people have taken part in the turnoff, with millions participating each year.

In 2010, Campaign for a Commercial-Free Childhood (CCFC) became the home of Screen-Free Week at the request of the Board of the Center for SCREEN-TIME Awareness (CSTA), which ran the initiative since 1994 (first as TV-Free America).  CCFC launched a new website and developed a new Organizer's Kit, fact sheets, and other materials for Screen-Free Week 2011 and beyond.  The Screen-Free Week Organizer's Kit is available as a free download.

History

In 1994, the week was first championed by TV-Free America, and promoted by Adbusters magazine and other organizations. TV-Free America then became Center for SCREEN-TIME Awareness. CSTA was an organization that encouraged all people to use electronic screen media responsibly and then have more time for a healthy life and more community participation. It was a grassroots alliance of many different organizations, with participation in over 70 nations around the world. Screen Free week happens in Canada.

CCFC changed the name of TV-Turnoff to Screen-Free Week in 2010, since entertainment media (and advertising) are increasingly delivered through a variety of screens (computers, hand-held devices, etc.), and not just traditional television commercials. In 2008, Adbusters changed the name of TV Turnoff Week to Digital Detox Week to reflect the growing predominance of computers and other digital devices.

The 2019 event took place from 29 April to 5 May.

Members and supporters
Important members of the network include Adbusters in Canada and White Dot in the UK (named after the small white dot that would briefly appear when turning off older TV sets, especially black-and-white ones). A related organization, works in many countries with large Spanish-speaking populations. In France,  is part of the event. In Brazil, Instituto Alana promotes the Semana sem telas.

More than seventy other organizations, such as the American Heart Association, the American Medical Association, Big Brothers Big Sisters of America the YMCA, and the Association of Waldorf Schools of North America (AWSNA) support the movement in the US. In 2004, a major partnership was created with the American Academy of Pediatrics.

See also
Culture jamming
Digital addict
Digital detox
Four Arguments for the Elimination of Television
History of television
Media psychology
Social aspects of television
Television studies

References

Further reading
 
 
 
 
 
 
 
"Turning Off the TV" article at The Washington Post. April 24, 2006.  Accessed December 23, 2008.

External links

Campaign for a Commercial-Free Childhood
Adbusters Media Foundation

Child welfare activism
Television organizations
Awareness weeks
Television terminology
History of television
May observances